Sébastien Gros (born 8 November 1989) is a French professional golfer.

Gros was born in Villeurbanne, France. He turned professional in 2011 and played on the Alps Tour. He won on the Alps Tour in 2012 and 2013. He began playing on the Challenge Tour and Asian Tour in 2014. At the end of 2014, he played all three stages of the European Tour Qualifying School: he finished 32nd, just missing out on a place on the main tour, but earned a place on the Challenge Tour for 2015.

Gros won his first Challenge Tour event in 2015 at the Najeti Open in Saint-Omer, France, and also won the Kazakhstan Open later in the year. He was second in the 2015 Challenge Tour Order of Merit to earn a place on the European Tour for 2016.

Gros played on the European Tour from 2016 to 2018. He lost his card after the 2017 season but regained it through Q School. He lost his card again after the 2018 season and returned to the Challenge Tour for 2019.

In February 2020 he won the Newgiza Open on the MENA Tour.

Amateur wins
2008 Biarritz Cup
2009 Grand Prix De La Ligue Paca
2010 Trophee Thomas de Kristoffy, Grand Prix de Limere, Grand Prix de Savoie
2011 Trophee Thomas de Kristoffy

Source:

Professional wins (6)

Challenge Tour wins (2)

Alps Tour wins (2)

MENA Tour wins (1)

French Tour wins (1)

Team appearances
Amateur
European Amateur Team Championship (representing France): 2011

See also
2015 Challenge Tour graduates
2017 European Tour Qualifying School graduates

References

External links

French male golfers
European Tour golfers
Asian Tour golfers
People from Villeurbanne
Sportspeople from Lyon Metropolis
1989 births
Living people
21st-century French people